Haddon is a suburb of Johannesburg, South Africa. Located south of the CBD, it is located close to the larger suburb of Turffontein. It is located in Region F of the City of Johannesburg Metropolitan Municipality.

History
Prior to the discovery of gold on the Witwatersrand in 1886, the suburb lay on land on one of the original farms called Turffontein. It became a suburb on 26 March 1919.

References

Johannesburg Region F